Joshuah Bledsoe (born December 30, 1998) is an American football safety for the New England Patriots of the National Football League (NFL). He played college football at Missouri.

Early years
Bledsoe attended Dekaney High School in Harris County, Texas. He played safety, cornerback and running back in high school. He committed to the University of Missouri to play college football.

College career
Bledsoe played at Missouri from 2017 to 2020. During his career, he had 130 tackles, one interception and one sack over 46 games.

Professional career

Bledsoe was drafted by the New England Patriots in the 6th round, 188th overall, of the 2021 NFL Draft. He signed his four-year rookie contract on May 13, 2021. He was placed on the active/non-football injury list at the start of training camp on July 21, 2021. He was placed on the reserve list to start the season. He was activated on December 14. He was placed on injured reserve on December 30 with a calf injury.

References

External links
Missouri Tigers bio

1998 births
Living people
Players of American football from Houston
American football safeties
Missouri Tigers football players
New England Patriots players